Esther Estrella (born Esther Cordery; September 6, 1919 – March 29, 2005) was an American film actress from 1940 to 1942 who appeared in Western films and serials. She made ten films including Prairie Pioneers (1941) in which she was the female lead alongside The Three Mesquiteers.

Filmography

 The Light of Western Stars (1940) as Bonita
 Three Men from Texas (1940) as Paquita Serrano
 Prairie Pioneers (1941) as Dolores Ortega
 Blood and Sand (1941) as street gachi (uncredited)
 Aloma of the South Seas (1941) as handmaiden (uncredited)
 Down Mexico Way (1941) as flower girl (uncredited)
 To the Shores of Tripoli (1942) as Spanish girl (uncredited)
 In Old California (1942) as Maria Alvarez (uncredited)
 Prairie Pals (1942) as Betty Wainwright
 Undercover Man (1942) as Dolores Gonzales

References

External links
 
 

1919 births
2005 deaths
20th-century American actresses
American film actresses
Film serial actresses
Western (genre) film actresses